Peter Yawger House is a historic home located at Union Springs in Cayuga County, New York.  It was built in 1838–1840 in the Greek Revival style on the east shore of Cayuga Lake.  It consists of a -story, five-by-three-bay, brick gable-roofed main block, with a 1-story, gable-roofed kitchen wing. The front portico is supported by four massive fluted Ionic columns.

The property spans from Cayuga Lake shore to New York State Route 90.

It was listed on the National Register of Historic Places in 2004.

References

External links

Houses on the National Register of Historic Places in New York (state)
Greek Revival houses in New York (state)
Houses completed in 1840
Houses in Cayuga County, New York
National Register of Historic Places in Cayuga County, New York